The 1992–93 Manhattan Jaspers basketball team represented Manhattan College during the 1992–93 NCAA Division I men's basketball season. The Jaspers, led by first year head coach Fran Fraschilla, played their home games at Draddy Gymnasium and were members of the Metro Atlantic Athletic Conference. They finished the season 23–7, 12–2 in MAAC play to finish in first place. They were champions of the MAAC tournament to earn an automatic bid to the NCAA tournament where they lost in the first round to Virginia.

Roster

Schedule and results

|-
!colspan=9 style=";"| Non-Conference Regular season

|-
!colspan=9 style=";"| MAAC Regular season

|-
!colspan=9 style=";"| MAAC tournament

|-
!colspan=9 style=";"| NCAA tournament

References

Manhattan Jaspers basketball seasons
Manhattan
Manhattan
Manhattan Jaspers men's basketball
Manhattan Jaspers men's basketball